UFC 180: Werdum vs. Hunt was a mixed martial arts event held on November 15, 2014, at Arena Ciudad de México in Mexico City, Mexico.

Background
The event was the first the organization hosted in Mexico and was so popular that all 21,000 tickets were sold out in 8 hours.

The event was expected to be headlined by a UFC Heavyweight Championship bout between the current champion Cain Velasquez and top contender Fabrício Werdum. However, on October 21, it was announced that Velasquez was forced to pull out of the bout due to an injured knee and was replaced by Mark Hunt. That also changed the originally planned title fight into an interim title bout.

Also featured on the card were the featherweight and bantamweight finals of the inaugural installment of The Ultimate Fighter: Latin America.

Norman Parke was expected to face Diego Sanchez at the event.  However, Parke pulled out of the bout in early October citing a knee injury and was briefly replaced by Joe Lauzon. In turn, injuries to both Sanchez and Lauzon led to the pairing being scrapped altogether.

Érik Pérez was expected to face Marcus Brimage at the event. However, Pérez pulled out of the bout due to a shoulder injury. In turn, Brimage was then pulled from the card as well and was matched up with Jumabieke Tuerxun for an earlier bout at UFC Fight Night: Rockhold vs. Bisping.

Two announced bouts between The Ultimate Fighter: Latin America contestants Masio Fullen vs. Alexander Torres and Fredy Serrano vs. Bentley Syler, previously linked to this event were postponed and will be rescheduled at future events.

Results

Bonus awards
The following fighters were awarded $50,000 bonuses:

Fight of the Night: Henry Briones vs. Guido Cannetti
Performance of the Night: Fabrício Werdum and Kelvin Gastelum

See also
List of UFC events
2014 in UFC

References

Ultimate Fighting Championship events
Events in Mexico City
Sports competitions in Mexico City
Mixed martial arts in Mexico
2014 in mixed martial arts